Filadelfia is a comune (municipality) in the Province of Vibo Valentia in the Italian region Calabria, located about  southwest of Catanzaro and about  northeast of Vibo Valentia. It was named after the city of Philadelphia in the United States.

The municipality of Filadelfia contains the frazioni (subdivisions) of Montesoro, Pontenisi, Zagheria, Shiocca, Scarro, Nucarelle, Lucente and many other tiny villages.

Filadelfia borders the following municipalities: Curinga, Francavilla Angitola, Jacurso, Polia.

Demographic evolution 
Population from census (see ref 1)

Filadelfia has seen a large decrease in people recently. This is due to the undeveloped technology and living conditions. It is at high elevation (roughly 600 m) and is at risk of earthquakes. In the summertime, July and August, this small, inviting town receives many tourists from Switzerland. People from the United States, Germany and France are also spotted here during the summer months. Younger people are leaving the town at a fast pace to find employment. They are moving to cities in a process known as urbanization. Many homes in this small town in Calabria, are "for sale" or "vendesi". About 20 years ago, the population was about 10,000. It is currently below 5,900.

References

External links
 Comune di Filadelfia official website

Cities and towns in Calabria